The colony of Greenland was a Danish colony created in 1950 with the union of North Greenland and South Greenland, and was ruled by one governor. In 1953, the colony of Greenland was made an equal part of Denmark as an amt.

References

1950 establishments in North America
1953 disestablishments in North America
Former Danish colonies
1950s establishments in Greenland
20th-century establishments in Greenland
History of Greenland